Ieva "Eva" Kampe (married name Vlahov; born 29 November 1940) is a former Latvian-Australian track and field athlete who represented Australia in the long jump at the 1962 British Empire and Commonwealth Games. She placed fourth in the event, and also won two medals at the Australian Athletics Championships.

Early life
Kampe was born in Latvia, arriving in Australia after the Second World War as a refugee and settling in Perth with her family. Two of her uncles were murdered during the 1940 Soviet occupation of Latvia, while her maternal grandparents were killed during the Latvian War of Independence. Kampe's father, Leo, had been a minister in the Evangelical Lutheran Church of Latvia, and continued his ministry after arriving in Australia, supported by the Lutheran Church of Australia.

Athletics career
At the 1962 Australian Open Track and Field Championships, held in Adelaide, Kampe won a silver medal in the modern pentathlon and a bronze medal in the long jump. Later in the year, she was selected to represent Australia at the 1962 British Empire and Commonwealth Games, which Perth hosted. Her only event was the long jump, where she was one of four Australian competitors. The Australians took out the first four places, with Pamela Ryan taking gold, Helen Frith silver, and Janet Knee bronze. Kampe jumped , which was  behind Knee's best jump.

Family
Kampe married Len Vlahov, who also represented Australia in athletics at the 1962 Perth Games. Their son, Andrew Vlahov, became a professional basketball player, while a grandson, Griffin Logue, is a professional Australian rules footballer.

References

1940 births
Living people
Athletes (track and field) at the 1962 British Empire and Commonwealth Games
Commonwealth Games competitors for Australia
Australian female long jumpers
Australian Lutherans
Australian female modern pentathletes
Latvian emigrants to Australia
Latvian World War II refugees
Refugees in Australia
Sportswomen from Western Australia
Track and field athletes from Western Australia